Kern Bridge or Yaeger Bridge crossed the Le Sueur River in Blue Earth County in the U.S. state of Minnesota. It was built in 1873 using a bowstring through truss design by the Wrought Iron Bridge Company. It was listed on the National Register of Historic Places in 1980 as Minnesota's only bowstring arch truss bridge and oldest road bridge still in use. However, it was closed to vehicle traffic in 1991.

In 2019, the Minnesota Department of Transportation (MnDOT) announced plans to dismantle the bridge and store it for eventual reuse elsewhere. According to the department's website, it has been removed and is available for suitable relocation.

Mankato will receive federal funding (80 percent of cost) to relocate and rehabilitate the bridge.

According to MnDOT, "Although Mankato is urban, the future Kern Bridge setting is wooded, crosses a large river, and is a similar context to the original bridge site." Pedestrians and bicyclists will access the bridge through the existing trail system. "The bridge will be seen from the north via a scenic overlook and from the south via U.S. Highway 169. Though the proposal included use of extensive approach spans to meet the river’s width," MnDOT says, "the choice of a streamlined girder will allow the arch to be visually prominent, an important consideration in re-listing the bridge" on the National Register of Historic Places.

See also
List of bridges documented by the Historic American Engineering Record in Minnesota

References

External links

Bowstring truss bridges in the United States
Bridges completed in 1873
Buildings and structures in Blue Earth County, Minnesota
Historic American Engineering Record in Minnesota
National Register of Historic Places in Blue Earth County, Minnesota
Road bridges on the National Register of Historic Places in Minnesota
Transportation in Blue Earth County, Minnesota
Wrought iron bridges in the United States
1873 establishments in Minnesota
Le Sueur River